Chelsea College may refer to:

 Chelsea College (17th century), a polemical college founded in London in 1609
 Chelsea College of Art and Design
 Chelsea College of Science and Technology, in London
 Chelsea College of Aeronautical and Automobile Engineering, in Shoreham-by-Sea, West Sussex, now part of Greater Brighton Metropolitan College
 Chelsea College of Physical Education, in Eastbourne, East Sussex, now part of the University of Brighton
 Kensington and Chelsea College, in west London
 Royal Hospital Chelsea, on the site of the 17th century college